Chief Opral Benson (born February 7, 1935) is an Americo-Liberian and Nigerian entrepreneur and socialite who holds the chieftaincy title of Iya Oge of Lagos. She was married to Chief T.O.S. Benson from 1962 until his death. Benson, a former university administrator manages a fashion and beauty school in Lagos and was a former director of Johnson's Products, Nigerian affiliate.

In 2012, she was appointed honorary consul of Liberia in Lagos.

Life

Benson was born Opral Mason in Arthington, Liberia to the family of Johnson and Lilly Mason, members of the aristocratic Americo-Liberian community. Her paternal great-grandfather and grandfather were immigrants from South Carolina who arrived in Liberia in 1869.  Her father's sister, Aunty Margaret, named her 'Opal' which is a type of jewel with changing colours. The name was a representation of great value, attractiveness and importance, and Margaret had believed that the baby would become very dear to the family. She also had another aunt, Amanda Mason who named her Amanda, after herself.

As the child grew up, she developed her questioning mind, and soon changed her name from 'Opal' to 'Opral'. "As i grew older,' she later recalled, 'I became uncomfortable with the name'. She thought she was not qualified to bear such a name because she was not a stone and could not decipher what was precious about her that made her different from other people. She was probably just being a modest little girl" 

Benson started education at an AME primary school in Arthington, and then proceeded to Arthington Central School, she then attended College of West Africa for secondary school studies. She had her first child in High School, the father, was John Bilson, a young biology teacher in her school, who later became a doctor in Ghana courtesy of a scholarship from the Liberian government. After the baby's birth, she continued studies and was later awarded a scholarship to study at Morris Brown College.

When Opral returned to Liberia she worked in the Department of Agriculture. In 1961, she was secretary during a conference of the Monrovia bloc of African states, in preparation for formation of OAU. At the conference. T.O.S. Benson came along with Tafawa Balewa, there both Benson and 26 year old Miss Benson became acquainted and later married in 1962. In Nigeria, Opral Benson worked as director of student affairs at university of Lagos. In 1973, she was bestowed the title of Iya Oge of Lagos by Oba Adeyinka Oyekan. After leaving Unilag, she joined Johnson Products Nigeria's board as chairman and established the Opral Benson Beauty Institute and Chic Afrique Enterprises at Yaba, Lagos. She also served as a pioneer board member of the National Youth Service Corps and was member of the Nigerian Olympic Committee in 1982.

There are very few Africans who have traversed the continent's socio-cultural landscape for as long and with as much panache and penetration as Opral Benson. In Nigeria and Liberia in particular, she has been a steady and recurring cultural cardinal for over half a century, defining, reconceptualising, and re-creating subliminal and popular trends in cultural and cross-national dialogue and diplomacy, and in beauty and fashion.

Opral has been a constant figure, in the movement for women's development on the continent, playing such crucial roles that have not only awakened many women to the imperatives and strategies of advancement, but have also positively engaged men and leaders at various levels, in the cause of developing women. As a beauty icon, she has been at the forefront of defining trends and customs for her contemporaries and younger generations. She has also explored beauty as an industry and a strong driver of business, and has economically empowered thousands of young people in the process.

Many articles have been written about her in various media, but her life story has been captured in her biography, 'Opral Benson: Life and Legend' authored by Udu Yakubu, PhD, a seasoned biographer and CEO of May University Press Limited, a biography publishing company.

References

1935 births
Living people
Americo-Liberian people
Liberian people
Nigerian women business executives
University of Lagos people
Liberian emigrants to Nigeria
Nigerian socialites
Businesspeople from Lagos
Beauticians
Nigerian fashion businesspeople
Benson family (Lagos)
People from Montserrado County
Nigerian corporate directors
Women corporate directors